Guapituba is a train station on CPTM Line 10-Turquoise, located in the city of Mauá.

History
In 1907, São Paulo Railway opened in the location the telegraph post Quilômetro 50. The passengers movement grew slowly, so that Quilômetro 50 post was a sporadic boarding point until the 1970s, not appearing in maps from 1954 to 1970.

The region around the station grew a lot during the 1960s and 1970s, specially with the arrival of lots o migrants to Parque das Américas, Jardim Santa Rosa, Parque Aliança and Vila Gomes. Also there was great movement in favor of the construction of Parque das Américas station, specially by Saint Philip the Apostle Parish represented by its first vicar, Father José João Rogério Maria Mahon.

According to local residents and the Parish history, practically all the manifestations were organized by the church, until they won and station construction began in 1982. Named Guapituba for being located in the homonymous Mauá neighbourhood, the station was opened on 4 June 1983.

In 1994, started being operated by CPTM as part of Line D-Beige (Luz ↔ Paranapiacaba).

References

Companhia Paulista de Trens Metropolitanos stations
Railway stations opened in 1983